Padinjare Vemballur  is a coastal village in Thrissur district in the state of Kerala, India.

Demographics
 India census, Padinjare Vemballur had a population of 11749 with 5520 males and 6229 females.

Geography 

Costal village situated in middle of southern state Kerala of India. West Arabian Sea all the other sides are locked with neighbouring villages.

Plain Terrain consist of land ,agricultural fields and ponds. Small interconnected streams within 1 km radium near to the sea carry water in rainy season and can be manually open and closed to remove water logged on terrain!.

Major Institutions 

 MES Asmabi College
 MES HSS P.Vemballur
 MES Public School
 MES UP School
 GFLPS Vekkode(Vekkod Fishery School)
 GLPS P. Vemballur
 Sri Sai Vidya Bhavan

References

Villages in Thrissur district